The Kawasaki GPZ1000RX (Ninja 1000R, model designation ZXT00A) was a motorcycle made by Kawasaki from 1986 to 1988. It had a  four-cylinder, 16-valve, twin cam engine.

The GPZ1000RX was to be the replacement for the original Ninja, the GPZ900R, but as it turned out the GPZ900R not only lived on alongside the GPZ1000RX, but outlived it. Just as the GPZ900R two years before, the 1000RX was the fastest production bike at the time. Until in 1988 the GPZ 1000RX was superseded by the ZX-10 "Tomcat". Yet still the GPZ900R remained, even beyond the 1990 release of Kawasaki's new flagship, the ZZ-R1100, until 2003.

References

GPZ1000RX
Sport bikes
Motorcycles introduced in 1986